Sumra bint Jundab (Arabic: سُمرة بنت جندب), also known as Ṣafīyya bint Junaydib (صفية بنت جنيدب), was the first wife of Abd al-Muttalib.

Her father was Jundab (or Junaydib) ibn Hujayr ibn Zabbab (or Riyab) ibn Habib ibn Suwa'a ibn Amir ibn Sa'sa'a ibn Mu'awiyah ibn Bakr ibn Hawazin ibn Mansur ibn Ikrima from the Hawazin tribe.

She married Abd al-Muttalib when he was young. Their son, al-Harith, remained Abd al-Muttalib's only child for many years.

References

Year of birth missing
Year of death missing
Family of Muhammad
Banu 'Amir
5th-century Arabs